Daniel Willems (16 August 1956 – 2 September 2016) was a Belgian road bicycle racer. Health problems ended his career in 1986. He competed in the team time trial event at the 1976 Summer Olympics.

Major results

1976
 5th Overall Ruban Granitier Breton
1977
 1st  Road race, National Amateur Road Championships
 1st  Overall Ruban Granitier Breton
1st Stages 1a & 4a (ITT)
 4th Flèche Ardennaise
 6th Ronde Van Vlaanderen Beloften
1978
 1st Kampioenschap van Vlaanderen
 1st Grote Prijs Stad Zottegem
 1st Circuit du Hainaut
 2nd Ronde Van Vlaanderen Beloften
 3rd Kattekoers
 7th Overall Ronde van Nederland
1979
 1st  Overall Four Days of Dunkirk
1st Stage 4b
 1st  Overall Tour of Belgium
1st Stage 4b
 1st Scheldeprijs
 1st Brabantse Pijl
 1st Rund um den Henninger-Turm
 2nd Overall Vuelta a Andalucía
 2nd Critérium des As
 3rd Overall Ronde van Nederland
 3rd Tour of Flanders
 3rd Liège–Bastogne–Liège
 4th Paris–Tours
 4th Circuit des Frontières
 5th Overall Paris–Nice
 5th Overall Three Days of De Panne
 6th Gent–Wevelgem
 6th Züri-Metzgete
 8th Milan–San Remo
 9th Circuit du Hainaut
1980
 1st  Overall Vuelta a Andalucía
1st Stages 3 & 5a
 1st Paris–Tours
 1st Ronde van Limburg
 1st Grand Prix Le Télégramme
 2nd Overall Tour of Belgium
1st Stage 5
 2nd Grand Prix Eddy Merckx
 4th Rund um den Henninger-Turm
 5th Overall Tour de Suisse
1st  Points classification
1st  Combination classification
1st Prologue, Stages 1, 2, 3, 4 & 5 (ITT)
 5th Züri-Metzgete
 7th Paris–Roubaix
 7th Amstel Gold Race
 8th Circuit du Hainaut
 9th Overall Tour de Romandie
 9th Tour du Haut Var
1981
 1st La Flèche Wallonne
 1st Critérium des As
 1st Heistse Pijl
 Tour de France
1st Stages 11 & 19 
 1st Stage 3 GP du Midi-Libre
 1st Stage 1a Tour of Belgium
 3rd Züri-Metzgete
 3rd Rund um den Henninger-Turm
 4th Grand Prix Eddy Merckx
 5th Overall Setmana Catalana de Ciclisme
1st Stages 1, 4 & 5
 6th Overall Tour de l'Aude
1st Stage 3 
 6th Trofeo Laigueglia
 10th Road race, National Road Championships
 10th Tour of Flanders
1982
 1st Grand Prix Eddy Merckx
 Tour Midi-Pyrénées
1st Stages 1a & 2 
 2nd Overall Three Days of De Panne
1st Stage 3
 2nd Le Samyn
 3rd E3 Prijs Vlaanderen
 6th Overall Tirreno–Adriatico
 7th Overall Tour de France
1st Stages 3 & 20
 7th Overall Four Days of Dunkirk
1st Stage 1 
 7th Brabantse Pijl
 8th Road race, National Road Championships
 8th Overall Tour de l'Aude
1983
 2nd Grand Prix Eddy Merckx

Grand Tour general classification results timeline

References

External links

Official Tour de France results for Daniel Willems

1956 births
2016 deaths
Belgian male cyclists
Belgian Tour de France stage winners
People from Herentals
Tour de Suisse stage winners
Olympic cyclists of Belgium
Cyclists at the 1976 Summer Olympics
Sportspeople from Antwerp Province